Lenox Avenue – also named Malcolm X Boulevard; both names are officially recognized – is the primary north–south route through Harlem in the upper portion of the New York City borough of Manhattan. This two-way street runs from Farmers' Gate at Central Park North (110th Street) to 147th Street. Its traffic is figuratively described as "Harlem's heartbeat" by Langston Hughes in his poem Juke Box Love Song. The IRT Lenox Avenue Line runs under the entire length of the street, serving the New York City Subway's .

From 119th Street to 123rd Street, Lenox Avenue is part of the Mount Morris Park Historic District, designated by the New York City Landmarks Preservation Commission in 1971.

History
Originally a part of Sixth Avenue, the segment north of Central Park was renamed in late 1887 for philanthropist James Lenox. In 1987, it was co-named Malcolm X Boulevard, in honor of the slain civil rights leader.

The avenue was the heart of Harlem during the Harlem Renaissance in the 1930s. The street brought together African Americans, Latinos, British West Indians, and Spaniards who developed relationships over common interests such as jazz and food. In 1932, Harlem was so firmly established as the world capital of jazz and African-American culture in general that "black cinema" films like Harlem Is Heaven were playing on the nation's big screens. Jazz flourished and grew like it could have in no other time and place. "You might have had 15 great clubs on one block, all going at once," said the trombonist and bandleader Wycliffe Gordon. "Imagine going into a joint to check out Willie 'The Lion' Smith, and sitting next to you are Duke Ellington and James P. Johnson." Lenox Avenue is thought by some to be one of the most important streets in the world for African American culture.

The Savoy Ballroom was located between 140th and 141st Streets on Lenox Avenue. Other historical venues of Lenox Avenue are Sylvia's Restaurant, located between 126th and 127th; and the Lenox Lounge, located between 124th and 125th.

In popular culture

 
 The corner of Lenox Avenue and 125th Street is mentioned in the song "When the Revolution Comes" by The Last Poets on their self-titled album (1970).
 Small Talk at 125th and Lenox (1970) is an album by Gil Scott-Heron.
 Lenox Avenue Breakdown is an album by jazz alto saxophonist Arthur Blythe. Columbia Records released the album in 1979.
 In The Fire Next Time, James Baldwin refers to Lenox Avenue simply as "The Avenue".
 The main characters of the 1992 novel Jazz by Toni Morrison live on Lenox Avenue.
 The video for Madonna's 1994 single "Secret" was shot on Lenox Avenue.
 "Lenox Avenue: Midnight", a well-known poem by Langston Hughes, is set on Lenox Avenue, as is his "The Weary Blues". The avenue is mentioned in his "Juke Box Love Song" and "Consider Me".
 The avenue is featured in the first verse of the original Irving Berlin lyrics of "Puttin' On the Ritz". The song refers to the then-popular fad of poor but flashily dressed black Harlemites parading up and down Lenox Avenue, "Spending ev'ry dime / For a wonderful time".
 In the title track of his debut record Lifestylez ov da Poor & Dangerous, Big L raps about 139th Street and Lenox Avenue.
 The street signs are heavily featured in the opening titles of the 2016 Netflix series Luke Cage, which takes place and was filmed in Harlem.
 Part of Teyana Taylor's 2018 music video for the remix of "Gonna Love Me" was shot on Lenox Avenue, near a mural of Big L.
 The last line of the "Strut Miss Lizzie" patter has "...get set for Lenox Avenue."
 In the 1995 movie Die Hard with a Vengeance, Simon Peter Gruber requires Lieutenant John McClane to get to the crossing of Lenox Anenue and the 128th Street, where he is quickly meeting with buddy Zeus (played by Samuel L. Jackson), although the scene was actually shot in Audubon Avenue, close to West 175th Street (Washington Heights, Manhattan)

Gallery

References

Further reading
Paterson, David "Black, Blind, & In Charge: A Story of Visionary Leadership and Overcoming Adversity."Skyhorse Publishing. New York, New York, 2020

External links

Streets in Manhattan
Harlem